The Speedway World Pairs Championship was an annual speedway (motorcycling) event held each year in different countries. The first competition was held in 1968 and the final competition was held in 1993. From 1994 it was merged with the World Team Cup to create the Speedway World Cup, which held its final edition in 2017.

The concept of an international pairs championship was reestablished in the form of the Speedway of Nations, which was held for the first time in 2018.

Rules 
The final was competed between seven national teams, and each national team was represented by two riders. Each pairing rode against each other once. The pair with the highest combined score were declared the Champions. From 1991, a third rider could act as reserve.

Winners

Medal classification

See also 
 Motorcycle speedway
 Speedway of Nations, the current incarnation of the World Pairs Championship

References

 
Pairs
Recurring sporting events established in 1968
Recurring sporting events disestablished in 1993